The 2021 PDC World Darts Championship (known for sponsorship reasons as the 2021 William Hill World Darts Championship) was the 28th World Championship organised by the Professional Darts Corporation since it separated from the British Darts Organisation. The collapse of the BDO in September 2020 and subsequent postponement of the World Darts Federation-sanctioned event meant that this edition was the first undisputed World Championship in the sport since John Lowe won the Embassy in 1993. The event took place at the Alexandra Palace in London from 15 December 2020 – 3 January 2021, and was played behind closed doors, except for the first day of the tournament, due to the COVID-19 pandemic.

Peter Wright was the defending champion, after defeating Michael van Gerwen 7–3 in the 2020 final. However, he was surprisingly eliminated by Gabriel Clemens in the third round.
 
Gerwyn Price won the World Championship for the first time in his career, beating Gary Anderson 7–3 in the final. As a result of winning the title, Gerwyn took over from Michael van Gerwen as world number 1.

Steve Beaton played in a record 30th consecutive World Championship (including the BDO version), breaking the record he jointly held with Phil Taylor, but lost in the first round to Diogo Portela.

James Wade hit his first World Championship nine-dart finish and the first PDC World Championship nine-darter since 2016 in his third round defeat to Stephen Bunting.

Format
All matches were played as single in, double out; requiring the players to score 501 points to win a leg, finishing on either a double or the bullseye. Matches were played to set format, with each set being the best of five legs (first to three). A rule which has been in place for previous tournaments, where the final set had to be won by two clear legs, was removed in order to prevent sessions overrunning.

The matches got longer as the tournament progresses:
First round: Best of five sets
Second round: Best of five sets
Third round: Best of seven sets
Fourth round: Best of seven sets
Quarter-finals: Best of nine sets
Semi-finals: Best of eleven sets
Final: Best of thirteen sets

Prize money
The prize money for the tournament was £2,500,000 in total – the same as in the previous year. The winner's share was £500,000.

Qualification

Qualifiers
The top 32 from the PDC Order of Merit began the competition in the second round. The 32 highest ranked players on the PDC Pro Tour Order of Merit (not already qualified) and 32 qualifiers from around the world began in the first round.

Order of Merit Second round (seeded)

  (quarter-finals)
  (third round)
  (champion)
  (second round)
  (second round)
  (third round)
  (third round)
  (semi-finals)
  (fourth round)
  (second round)
  (quarter-finals)
  (fourth round)
  (runner-up)
  (third round)
  (quarter-finals)
  (fourth round)
  (third round)
  (third round)
  (fourth round)
  (third round)
  (second round)
  (third round)
  (second round)
  (third round)
  (third round)
  (semi-finals)
  (fourth round)
  (second round)
  (fourth round)
  (third round)
  (fourth round)
  (third round)

Pro Tour Order of MeritFirst Round
  (first round)
  (fourth round)
  (quarter-finals)
  (second round)
  (second round)
  (second round)
  (first round – withdrew)
  (third round)
  (second round)
  (second round)
  (second round)
  (third round)
  (first round)
  (first round)
  (second round)
  (second round)
  (third round)
  (second round)
  (second round)
  (second round)
  (second round)
  (second round)
  (first round)
  (first round)
  (first round)
  (second round)
  (first round)
  (second round)
  (second round)
 (second round)
  (first round)
  (second round)

International qualifiersfirst round
  – PDC Women's Series (first round)
  – CDC USA Series (third round)
  – DPA Pro Tour (first round)
  – PDC Development Tour (first round)
  – World Youth Champion (first round)
  – CDC Canadian Series (first round)
  – African Qualifier (second round)
  – UK Tour Card Holders' Qualifier (second round)
  – PDC Challenge Tour (first round)
  – PDJ Japanese Championship (second round)
  – Indian Darts Federation (first round)
  - EADC Qualifier (first round)
  – PDC Women's Series (first round)
  – PDC Asia Philippines Qualifier (first round)
  – PDC Nordic & Baltic (first round)
  – UK Tour Card Holders' Qualifier (second round)
  – Eastern European Qualifier (first round)
  – Superleague Germany (second round)
  – PDC Nordic & Baltic (first round)
  – CDC Continental Cup (first round)
  – UK Tour Card Holders' Qualifier (second round)
  – PDC Asia Hong Kong Qualifier (second round)
  – PDC China Qualifier (first round)
  – DPA Pro Tour (first round)
  – PDC Development Tour (first round)
  – South American Representative (second round)
  – DPNZ Order of Merit (first round)
  – Rest of World Tour Card Holder's Qualifier (first round)
   – PDC Asia Japan Qualifier (first round)
  – UK Tour Card Holders' Qualifier (first round)
  – PDC Asia China Qualifier (first round)
  – Rest of World Tour Card Holder's Qualifier (first round)

Notes

Background

Michael van Gerwen, the runner-up in the 2020 PDC World Darts Championship and winner of the 2014, 2017 and 2019 championships, was top of the two-year PDC Order of Merit and number one seed going into the tournament, having won the UK Open and Players Championship Finals titles in 2020. The reigning champion from 2020 Peter Wright was second seed, having additionally won the 2020 European Championship; and 2020 World Grand Prix champion Gerwyn Price was the third seed. As well as Van Gerwen and Wright, three other previous PDC world champions qualified as seeds: two-time champions Gary Anderson (13th seed) and Adrian Lewis (21st seed), and 2018 champion Rob Cross (fifth seed). Two champions of the BDO World Darts Championship qualified as seeds: three-time BDO champion and 2020 Premier League Darts winner Glen Durrant (12th seed) and 2014 BDO champion Stephen Bunting (26th seed).

The top seeds below Van Gerwen, Wright and Price were 2019 World finalist Michael Smith, Rob Cross, 2019 UK Open champion Nathan Aspinall, 2020 Grand Slam and European Championship finalist James Wade, 2019 World Grand Prix finalist Dave Chisnall, and 2020 World Matchplay winner Dimitri Van den Bergh. 2020 Grand Slam of Darts winner José de Sousa was seeded 14th.

Damon Heta, in his first full year as a full PDC tour card holder, was the highest-ranked non-seed on the 2020 PDC Pro Tour Order of Merit. Two-time BDO World Champion Scott Waites qualified for the PDC World Championship for the first time, and was one of two former BDO Champions to qualify through the Pro Tour, alongside Steve Beaton, the 1996 BDO champion, competing in a record-breaking 30th consecutive World Championship.

As well as Waites, six other players from the Pro Tour made their PDC Championship debuts; Mike De Decker, Martijn Kleermaker, Maik Kuivenhoven, Jason Lowe, Ryan Murray and Derk Telnekes. Other players to qualify via the Pro Tour included 2020 World Grand Prix finalist Dirk van Duijvenbode and 2012 PDC World Championship runner-up Andy Hamilton.

The international qualifiers were heavily impacted by the worldwide COVID-19 pandemic, with a number of qualification tournaments being cancelled. The North American Darts Championship was cancelled, with the place being given to Danny Lauby, the winner of the 2019 CDC Continental Cup. The cancellation of the Oceanic Masters resulted in a second place being given on the Dartplayers Australia tour; and the cancellation of the New Zealand championship saw the place instead being given to the top player on the Dartplayers New Zealand tour, Haupai Puha. The qualifiers for India and South America were both cancelled, with the Indian place going to the Indian Darts Federation number one Amit Gilitwala, and the South American place being given to Diogo Portela, who had won the South American qualifier the three previous years it had been held.

The PDC Asia Tour was fully cancelled, with the four places being awarded to the winners of one-off qualification events in China, Hong Kong, Japan, and the Philippines. The Tom Kirby Irish Matchplay as well as qualifiers for Southern Europe, Western Europe, and Central Europe were not held in 2020; with these places being given to the final Pro Tour holders qualifier. One further change saw the two qualification events for female players being replaced with the new, four-event long, PDC Women's Series, with the top two players over those events – four-times BDO Women's World Champion Lisa Ashton and Deta Hedman – qualifying for the World Championship.

The final six places – four from uncompleted qualifiers and two as planned – were given to the winners of an event for Tour Card holders held at the conclusion of the PDC Series. Four places were reserved for players from the UK and Ireland and two from the rest of the world; a change from previous years where the places were unassigned. The six players to get through the qualifier included Jamie Lewis, a former World Championship semi-finalist.

Thirteen players from international qualifiers made their PDC World Championship debuts; Bradley Brooks, Cameron Carolissen, David Evans, Edward Foulkes, Amit Gilitwala, Dmitriy Gorbunov, Deta Hedman, Nick Kenny, Danny Lauby, Haupai Puha, Toru Suzuki, Di Zhuang and Niels Zonneveld.

Martijn Kleermaker withdrew from the tournament after testing positive for COVID-19 on 20 December. As the first alternate Josh Payne had been in close contact with someone who had also received a positive test, Kleermaker's first round opponent Cameron Carolissen received a bye.

Summary
UK government regulations following the COVID-19 pandemic in the United Kingdom allowed Tier 2 areas, including London, to hold sporting events with up to 1,000 spectators indoors. The Professional Darts Corporation announced that the World Championship would be the first PDC event in the United Kingdom to allow fans, since the UK Open in March 2020. Fans attending the event were not allowed to wear fancy dress and 'football style' chanting was prohibited. With London subsequently moving to Tier 3 on 16 December, it meant that the tournament was held behind closed doors for all sessions barring the opening night.

The top quarter of the draw saw number one seed Michael van Gerwen defeat Ryan Murray in the second round, before a 4–0 win over Ricky Evans qualified him for the fourth round. In that round, Van Gerwen came from 3–1 down and survived two darts at the bullseye from Joe Cullen to win in a sudden death last leg and reach the quarter-final for the fifth consecutive year and the eighth time overall. Number eight seed Dave Chisnall reached his third PDC World Championship quarter-final after wins over Keegan Brown, Danny Noppert and Dimitri Van den Bergh. In the quarter-final, Chisnall stunned Michael van Gerwen with a 5–0 whitewash win over the world number one to reach the first PDC World Championship semi-final of his career. This defeat was van Gerwen's first whitewash loss (without winning a set) since 2009, when he lost to Phil Taylor.

The two highest seeds in the second quarter were both eliminated early, with fourth seed Michael Smith losing 3–1 to debutant Jason Lowe and fifth seed Rob Cross losing in a sudden death last leg to Dirk van Duijvenbode. Former world champion Adrian Lewis also exited in the second round, losing to American Danny Baggish 3–1. Two time champion Gary Anderson beat Madars Razma in the second round before beating Mensur Suljović 4–3 in a controversial game, with Anderson accusing his opponent of gamesmanship. Anderson then whitewashed Lowe's conqueror Devon Petersen to reach the eighth PDC World Championship quarterfinal of his career. Van Duijvenbode followed up his win over Cross with a 4–0 win over Adam Hunt and a second last-leg victory, this time over Glen Durrant, to reach his first PDC World Championship quarter-final. Van Duijvenbode won the first set against Anderson in the quarter-final, but Anderson turned the game around including a run of ten legs in a row to win the match 5–1.

Peter Wright opened his title defence with a 3–1 win over Steve West, appearing on stage dressed as The Grinch. Wright's reign was ended in the next round, after Gabriel Clemens won a last leg decider over him. Krzysztof Ratajski made it past Ryan Joyce and Simon Whitlock without dropping a set, before knocking out Clemens with a last leg victory of his own, with both players missing multiple darts to win before Ratajski finally hit double one to take the win and become the first Polish player to make a PDC World Championship quarter-final. Seventh seed James Wade was eliminated in the third round by Stephen Bunting, despite hitting the first perfect Nine-dart finish at the World Championship since Gary Anderson at the 2016 PDC World Darts Championship. Bunting overcame Ryan Searle in the fourth round to qualify for the quarter-finals for the second time. In the quarter-final; Bunting took the first three sets and led 4–1 after the fifth. Ratajski closed the gap to 4–3 over the next two sets but Bunting broke throw in the eighth set to complete the win and qualify for his first PDC World Championship semi-final.

In the fourth quarter, third seed Gerwyn Price came thorough a last set decider against fellow Welshman Jamie Lewis and a sudden death last leg decider against 30th seed Brendan Dolan to reach the fourth round, where he took a 4–1 win over Mervyn King to reach the quarter-final for the second consecutive year. He was joined in the quarter-final by Daryl Gurney, who reached that stage for the second time after wins over William O'Connor, Chris Dobey, and Vincent van der Voort. In the quarter-final, Price twice led by two sets at 2–0 & 4–2; and on both occasions Gurney won the next two sets to level. The final set went to a final leg, with Price eventually hitting the double 20 to win and reach a second consecutive semi-final.

The first semi-final played was between Price and Bunting. Price won the first set and took a 2–0 lead in the second before Bunting fought back to take the second set and the next two. Price took the fifth and sixth sets to level before Bunting again fought back from 2–0 down in a set to lead after the seventh set. Price levelled the match by winning the eighth set and won the last two sets by 3–0 and 3–1 to become the first Welsh player to reach a PDC World Championship final. The thirteen 100+ finishes thrown by the two players was a record combined count for a PDC World Championship match.

In the second semi-final, Anderson and Chisnall shared the first two sets, before Anderson claimed the next two to take a 3–1 lead. Chisnall broke Anderson's throw to take the fifth set, but Anderson immediately broke back and won the sixth. Again, Chisnall won the seventh set but Anderson restored the two set advantage with an eighth set victory. Anderson won all three legs in the ninth set to secure a 6–3 win, qualifying the two-time World Champion for his fifth PDC World Championship final.

The final between Anderson and Price was held on 3 January 2021. Anderson threw first in the first set and won the first two legs, but missed four darts for a 3–0 set win, and Price came back to take the set 3–2. Anderson broke back with a 3–1 win in the second set. Price broke again in the third set despite a "big fish" 170 finish from Anderson, and held his throw in the fourth set to take a 3–1 advantage. Price again broke Anderson's throw in the fifth set, and won the sixth 3–0. Price took a two leg lead in the seventh set, but Anderson fought back to take only his second set of the match. Price regained the four-set advantage by winning the eighth set to go one away from winning the title. Price missed nine darts for the championship in the ninth set, which Anderson won. In the tenth set, Price fought back from 2–0 to eventually take the set and the championship, winning the title on double five.

Price's first World Championship additionally saw him take the number one spot on the PDC Order of Merit away from Michael van Gerwen, the Dutchman having held the title for seven years since winning the 2014 PDC World Darts Championship.

Schedule

Draw
The draw took place on 3 December 2020, live on Sky Sports News.

Final

Finals

Top half

Section 1

Section 2

Bottom half

Section 3

Section 4

Statistics

Top averages
This table shows the highest averages achieved by players throughout the tournament.

Representation
This table shows the number of players by country in the 2021 PDC World Championship. A total of 29 nationalities were represented, surpassing the record of the 2020 and 2019 editions by one.

Broadcasting rights

Television

References

2021
World Championship
World Championship
2020 in British sport
2021 in British sport
2020 sports events in London
2021 sports events in London
International sports competitions in London
Alexandra Palace
December 2020 sports events in the United Kingdom
January 2021 sports events in the United Kingdom